Blacktown City Bears (formerly known as Blacktown City) are an Australian rugby league football club based in Blacktown, New South Wales.

Notable players

Blacktown City / Blacktown City Bears

See also
List of rugby league clubs in Australia

References

External links
Blacktown City Bears website

Rugby league teams in Sydney
Rugby clubs established in 1953
Sports clubs established in 1953
1953 establishments in Australia